The 2017 Wake Forest Demon Deacons men's soccer team represents Wake Forest University during the 2017 NCAA Division I men's soccer season. It is the 71st season of the university fielding a program. It the program's third season with Bobby Muuss as head coach. The Demon Deacons play their home matches at Spry Stadium.

Roster 

Updated:August 28, 2017

Prior to the season Wake Forest named the three captains shown above.

Coaching Staff

Source:

Schedule

Source:

|-
!colspan=8 style=""| Exhibition

|-
!colspan=7 style=""| Regular season

|-
!colspan=6 style=""| ACC Tournament

|-
!colspan=6 style=""| NCAA Tournament

Awards and honors

Rankings

MLS Draft 
The following members of the 2017 Wake Forest Demon Deacons men's soccer team were selected in the 2018 MLS SuperDraft.

References

Wake Forest Demon Deacons
Wake Forest Demon Deacons men's soccer seasons
Wake Forest Demon Deacons, Soccer
Wake Forest Demon Deacons
Wake Forest
2017